The First Government of the Lao People's Democratic Republic was established on 2 December 1975.

Members

References

Bibliography
 

Governments of Laos
1975 establishments in Laos
1989 disestablishments in Laos